One Pacific Square, also known as the Northwest Natural Gas Building, is a high-rise building located at 220 Northwest 2nd Avenue in Portland, Oregon, United States. Construction was completed in 1983.  According to Bart King's An Architectural Guidebook to Portland, it has been nicknamed the "R2D2 Building".

In 2017, NW Natural announced plans to move out when the company's lease expires in 2020, after using the building as its headquarters for 30 years.

References

External links
 

1983 establishments in Oregon
Buildings and structures in Portland, Oregon
Office buildings completed in 1983
Old Town Chinatown